Seydiler is a district town in Kastamonu Province, Turkey.

Seydiler may also refer to the following places in Turkey:
Seydiler District, Kastamonu Province
Seydiler, İscehisar, a town in Afyonkarahisar Province
Seydiler, Manavgat, a village in Antalya Province
Seydiler, Tefenni, a village in Burdur Province